Gholam Serwar Nasher (also known as Ghulam Sarwar Nashir; 1922–1984) was the last ruling Khan of the Nasher and President of Spinzar Cotton Company in Kunduz, the most profitable company and one of the largest companies in pre-war Afghanistan.

Life 

Nashir was born in Qarabagh, Afghanistan to Mohammad Alam Khan Nasher, brother to Sher Khan Nasher, to an ethnic Pashtun Ghilzai family of Khans.

Nashir led the Spinzar Cotton Company in Kunduz, exporting cotton overseas, producing cotton seed oil, soap and porcelain.  He built hotels under the Spinzar brand in Kunduz, Kabul and other northern cities, employing over 20,000 people including woman working in the porcelain factory. He opened factories in the north, providing free housing for the employees, hospital, the only girls school in the city of Kunduz, sport clubs, and hotels. Nashir founded the Nashir Library and Museum.   

During his khanat, Kunduz become the richest province of the pre-war country, Spinzar being Afghanistan's most profitable company.

Nasher was awarded "The Order of the Golden House" by King Zahir Shah and "The Order of the Sacred Treasure" by the Emperor of Japan, in 1971.

Death
He died in exile in Germany in 1984 at the age of 62. He was survived by two wives, nine children and eight grandchildren.

Discovery of Ai-Khanoum 
On a hunting trip, Nashir discovered ancient artefacts of Ai Khanom and invited Princeton-archaeologist Daniel Schlumberger with his team to examine Ai-Khanoum. It was soon found to be a major city of the Greco-Bactrian kingdom and was extensively studied before the outbreak of the Soviet-Afghan War in 1979, during which it was comprehensively looted. Artefacts from the ruins have been exhibited worldwide.

References

Further reading

Dupree, Louis: Afghanistan
Emadi, Hafizullah: Dynamics of Political Development in Afghanistan. The British, Russian, and American Invasions
Meher, Jagmohan: Afghanistan: Dynamics of Survival
Runion, Meredith L.: The History of Afghanistan
Tanwir, Halim M.: AFGHANISTAN: History, Diplomacy and Journalism
An Introduction to the Commercial Law of Afghanistan, Second Edition, Afghanistan Legal Education Project (ALEP) at Stanford Law School

Afghan businesspeople
Afghan expatriates in Germany
Pashtun people
People from Kunduz Province
1922 births
1984 deaths
20th-century businesspeople